Ledio Fanucchi (March 27, 1931 – November 27, 2014) was an American football tackle and defensive tackle. He played for the Chicago Cardinals in 1954.

He died on November 27, 2014, in Fresno, California at age 83.

References

1931 births
2014 deaths
American football tackles
American football defensive tackles
Fresno State Bulldogs football players
Chicago Cardinals players